Elections are held in Fort Wayne, Indiana to elect the city's mayor. Currently, such elections are regularly scheduled to be held every four years, in the year immediately preceding that of United States presidential elections.

Elections before 1987

1987

The 1987 Fort Wayne mayoral election was held on November 3, 1987, to elect the mayor of Fort Wayne, Indiana, United States. It saw the election of Republican Paul Helmke, who unseated Democratic incumbent Winfield Moses.

1991

The 1991 Fort Wayne mayoral election was held on November 5, 1991, to elect the mayor of Fort Wayne, Indiana, United States. It saw the reelection of Republican incumbent Paul Helmke.

1995

The 1995 Fort Wayne mayoral election was held on November 7, 1995, to elect the mayor of Fort Wayne, Indiana, United States. It saw the reelection of Republican incumbent Paul Helmke. , this is the last time a Republican has won a Fort Wayne mayoral election.

Nominations

Democratic primary
Wayne Township Trustee Thomas Essex won the Democratic primary with 4,056 votes.

Republican primary
Some Republicans speculated that Helmke, who had ties to the Clinton administration, might have been endangered in his primary. However, contrarily, he handily won his primary with 75% of the vote (7,717 votes).

Libertarian nomination
Libertarians nominated William Kempf.

General election
The race was projected by Howey Political Report to be "safe Republican", with Helmke anticipated to be easily reelected.

1999

The 1999 Fort Wayne mayoral election was held on November 2, 1999, to elect the mayor of Fort Wayne, Indiana, United States. It saw the election of Democrat Graham Richard, who defeated Republican Linda Buskirk by a narrow margin.

Nominations

Democratic primary
Running for the Democratic nomination was Graham Richard, Agnes Hopkins, and David Roach.

Republican primary
Running for the Republican nomination was Linda Buskirk and Allen County Sheriff Joe Squadrito. While he had been seen as a frontrunner, Squadrito ultimately lost the primary to Buskirk.

Independent candidates
Independent candidates Sherri Emerson and William B. Dinkins also ran.

General election

2003

The 2003 Fort Wayne mayoral election was held on November 4 to elect the mayor of Fort Wayne, Indiana, US. It saw the reelection of Democratic incumbent Graham Richard, who again defeated Republican Linda Buskirk in what was a rematch of the 1999 election.

Nominations
Primary elections were held May 8.

During its primaries, the voter turnout in Allen County, in which Fort Wayne is located, was 11.9%.

Democratic primary

Republican primary

General election
The election was projected as a "tossup". Despite the race having been projected to be close, Richard won a sizable victory over Buskirk.

During the general election, the voter turnout in Allen County, in which Fort Wayne is located, was 30.63%.

2003 was a good year for Democrats in Indiana's mayoral elections, with the party winning control of the mayoralties of all of the state's top seven most populous cities for the first time since 1959. The Democratic Party also won control of the mayoralties in twenty of the state's thirty cities with populations above 25,000. Additionally, in 2003, Democrats won more than 56% of partisan mayoral races in Indiana.

During the general election, Allen County, where Fort Wayne is located, saw voter turnout of 25% in its various elections.

2007

The 2007 Fort Wayne mayoral election was held on November 6 to elect the mayor of Fort Wayne, Indiana, United States. It saw the election of Democrat Tom Henry.

Incumbent mayor Graham Richard did not seek reelection to a third term.

Nominations
Primary elections were held May 8.

Democratic primary

Republican primary

General election
In August, Kelty was indicted over perjury and campaign finance charges. While he denied wrongdoing, this story dominated the campaign.

During the general election, Allen County, where Fort Wayne is located, saw voter turnout of 21% in its various elections.

Aftermath
In October 2008, Kelty pleaded guilty to several of the campaign finance charges brought against him.

Henry would go on to be reelected in 2011, 2015, and 2019.

2011

The 2011 Fort Wayne mayoral election was held on November 8 to elect the mayor of Fort Wayne, Indiana, United States. It saw the reelection of Democrat Tom Henry.

Nominations
Primary elections were held May 3.

During the primary elections, the voter turnout in Allen County, in which Fort Wayne is located, was 12.78%.

Democratic primary

Republican primary

General election
During the general election, the voter turnout in Allen County, in which Fort Wayne is located, was 26.21%.

2015

The 2015 Fort Wayne mayoral election was held on November 3 to elect the mayor of Fort Wayne, Indiana, United States. It saw the reelection of Democrat Tom Henry to a third term.

Nominations
Primary elections were held May 5.

During the primary elections, the voter turnout in Allen County, in which Fort Wayne is located, was 9.82%.

Democratic primary

Republican primary

General election
During the general election, the voter turnout in Allen County, in which Fort Wayne is located, was 22.49%.

2019

The 2019 Fort Wayne mayoral election was held on November 5 to elect the mayor of Fort Wayne, Indiana, United States. Incumbent mayor Tom Henry was reelected to a fourth term.

Nominations
Primary elections were held May 7.

Democratic primary

Republican primary

General election
The election was not close with Henry winning easily. Earlier in the campaign Henry was thought to be vulnerable, but the race ended up not being close. In his victory speech, Henry announced that it would be his last term as mayor, though he later decided to run for a fifth term against businessman Tim Didier for 2023. He was sworn in for his fourth term on January 1, 2020. His fourth term will expire on January 1, 2024.

'''

References